William West may refer to:

Arts and entertainment
William West (artist) (1801–1861), English artist (of Bristol)
William West (director) of Flying Wild
William H. West (entertainer) (1853–1902), American minstrel show producer
William Edward West (1788–1859), American painter
William E. West Sr. (1922–2014), American painter
William West Anderson (1928–2017), birth name of American actor Adam West
William West (actor) (1856–1915), American actor

Law and politics
William West (Rhode Island politician) (c. 1733–1816), American militia general in the American Revolutionary War and later political leader
William West, 1st Baron De La Warr (c. 1520–1595), British political figure
William H. West (judge) (1824–1911), politician and member of the Ohio Supreme Court, 1872–1873
William H. West (policeman) (1842–1915), soldier and police officer
William H. West (Louisiana politician) (1928-2016), American politician and educator
William West (legal writer) (c. 1548–1598), English lawyer, known as the author of Symbolæographia
William Stanley West (1849–1914), U.S. Senator from Georgia
William West (1612–1670), English politician
William J. West (Canadian politician) (1892–1985), member of the Legislative Assembly of New Brunswick
William J. West (UK politician) (1868–?), British politician and trade unionist

Science
William West (chemist) (1792–1851), English chemist of the Leeds Philosophical and Literary Society
William West (botanist) (1848–1914), English botanist
William West Jr (1875–1901), English botanist
William James West (died 1848), English surgeon and apothecary
William Dixon West (1901–1994), English geologist

Sport
William West (sailor) (born 1931), Canadian Olympic sailor
William West (umpire) (1863–1938), cricketer and test match umpire
William West (equestrian) (1887–1953), American equestrian
William West (wrestler), British Olympic wrestler
Willie West (born 1938), American football defensive back
Wild Bill West (1875–?), American baseball player

Other
William Marcus West (fl. 1830s), Scottish-American pioneer

See also
Billy West (disambiguation)
West (name)
William (name)
William Cornwallis-West (1835–1917), British politician